The Bayer designations i Carinae and I Carinae are distinct (lower and upper case i) and refer to stars/star systems of apparent magnitude 3.96 and 3.99 respectively.

for i Carinae, see HD 79447
for I Carinae, see HR 4102

See also
ι Carinae (Iota Carinae)

Carinae, i
Carina (constellation)